Leonid Zuborev (Зуборев Леонид Иосифович, Зубараў Леанід Іосіфавіч, Зубарев; born November 18, 1943) is a Soviet born author and biographer from Minsk, Belarus. He has written 20 books (mostly in Russian) ranging from historical novels, biographies, and children's literature. He came to United States 25 years ago and continued to write in both English and Russian. Currently lives in Brooklyn, NY.

Works

Books
 Maxim Bahdanovich (1989)
 The Curious Prince (2011)
 Petrushka (2011) + video
 Fairy-Tales (2011, Juliette, New York). 
 Сказки Зубарева (2011)
 НесказАнная красота
 "Belarus" - Translation of U. Nyaklyaeu's verses  -  "Juliette, NY" (2015) 
 Atomic Bomb For Russia
 Jews of Belarus
 Zmitrok Byadulya
 Artist Nataly Ivanchik
 MUSIC OF LOVE (Score & Lyrics) Minsk, 2016,

Retold fables
“The Nutcracker” 
“Swan Lake” 
“The Magic Flute”
“Love for Three Oranges” 
“Sleeping Beauty”
“Three Little Pigs” 
“Puss in Boots”
“The Firebird” 
“By the Pike’s Command”
“The Smoker & Death"
"Petrushka"
"What? Where? When?"
"Thumbelina"

References

1943 births
Living people
Russian-language writers
American male writers